Camp Siegfried is a play by Bess Wohl. Its setting is the real Camp Siegfried where American children of German descent were taught Nazi ideology.

Background 
Playwright Wohl had rented a house in Bellport, Long Island, and had researched the nearby town of Yaphank. She discovered the town had hosted a camp for German-American youth, and felt it had the makings of a drama.

Productions 
Camp Siegfried premiered at The Old Vic theatre in London, in a production starring Patsy Ferran as Her and Luke Thallon as Him. The production played a limited run from 7 September 2021 to 30 October.

A production opened off-Broadway at the Tony Kiser Theatre on 15 November 2022 and ran through 4 December 2022, following previews from 25 October. The cast featured Sawyer Barth as Him and Lily McInerny as Her. The production was directed by David Cromer.

Critical reception 
In his 5 star review for The Independent, Paul Taylor described Camp Siegfried as "an insightful piece about the frightening appeal of fascism". In her 3 star review for The Guardian, Arifa Akbar states that "while Wohl’s dialogue is good at teen neurosis, it contains an offputtingly self-conscious tone, carefully crafted for cuteness".

See also
Camp Siegfried

References 

2021 plays
German American Bund
American plays
West End plays
Off-Broadway plays
Plays set in New York (state)
Long Island in fiction